Whitehaven railway station is a railway station serving the coastal town of Whitehaven in Cumbria, England. It is owned by Network Rail and managed by Northern Trains.

History

This station lay to the south of the present station, with the main entrance on Bransty Row (at ).

In 1854, the W&FJR passenger trains began using the WJR station at Whitehaven (Preston Street becoming a goods-only station). In 1865, the W&FJR was absorbed by the Furness Railway (FR), and in 1866, the WJR was absorbed by the London and North Western Railway (LNWR).

The LNWR station (formerly WJR) was replaced on 20 December 1874 by a new one named Whitehaven Bransty; it was jointly owned by the LNWR and the FR. This station had its name simplified to Whitehaven on 6 May 1968.  The original buildings were demolished and replaced by a modern single-story ticket hall in the mid-1980s.  The former goods yard site beyond and behind platform one is now occupied by a supermarket.

The station formerly had four operational platforms, but today only two remain in use (the former platforms three and four having lost their tracks when the layout was simplified and the buildings replaced).  The double line from Parton becomes single opposite the station signal box (which still bears the original station name Whitehaven Bransty) and then splits into two - one runs into platform one (a bay used by most terminating services from Carlisle) and the other runs into platform two, which is the through line to Sellafield, Millom and Barrow.  Trains heading south must collect a token for the single line section to St Bees from a machine on the platform (with the co-operation of the signaller) before they can proceed.  Conversely trains from Barrow must surrender the token upon arrival, the driver returning it to the machine before departing for Workington.  Only then can the signaller allow another train to enter the single line section.

Facilities
The ticket office is open six days per week (closed evenings and Sundays) and there is also a ticket machine available.  Digital display screens, a P.A. system and information posters provide train running information.  Step-free access is available through the main building to both platforms.

Services

There is generally an hourly service northbound to Carlisle and southbound  to Barrow-in-Furness (no late evening service operates south of here). A few through trains operate to/from Lancaster via the Furness Line.

Train operator Northern introduced a regular Sunday through service to Barrow via the coast at the May 2018 timetable change - the first such service south of Whitehaven for more than 40 years.  Services run approximately hourly from mid-morning until early evening, with later trains starting and terminating here.  This represents a major upgrade on the former infrequent service of four per day each way to/from Whitehaven only that previously operated.

A Sunday service over the whole length of the Coastal route operated on a one-off basis on Sunday 27 September 2009 (the first time a revenue earning passenger service operated south of Whitehaven since May 1976) to celebrate the ACoRP Community Rail Festival. An improved Sunday service has been introduced as part of the current Northern franchise.

References

Sources

Joy, D. Cumbrian Coast Railways. Dalesman Publishing 1968.
Joy, D. A Regional History of the Railways of Great Britain, Volume XIV: The Lake Counties.  David and Charles 1983. 
Quayle, H. Whitehaven - The Railways and Waggonways of a Unique Cumberland Port. Cumbrian Railways Association 2006.

External links

 
 

Railway stations in Cumbria
DfT Category E stations
Former Furness Railway stations
Former London and North Western Railway stations
Railway stations in Great Britain opened in 1847
Railway stations in Great Britain closed in 1874
Railway stations in Great Britain opened in 1874
Northern franchise railway stations
Whitehaven
1847 establishments in England